Marshall County (standard abbreviation: MS) is a county located in the U.S. state of Kansas.  As of the 2020 census, the county population was 10,038. The largest city and county seat is Marysville.

History
The Oregon Trail crosses Marshall County.  The Infamous Donner Reed Party rested along the banks of the Big Blue river and lost one of its members, Sarah Keyes, who is still buried at Alcove Springs (located outside of Marysville).  Many documented pioneer bodies are buried surrounding Alcove Spring.

In 1849 Francis James Marshall, from Weston, Missouri, came to Marshall County and established a ferry service on the Big Blue River at "Independence Crossing."  A few years later Francis Marshall decided to stay on in Marshall County and make it his home. He moved his Ferry business to an upper crossing now known as Marysville (the city is named after Marshall's own wife Mary).

On May 30, 1879, the "Irving, Kansas Tornado" passed through Marshall county. Eighteen people were killed and sixty were injured.

The Marshall County Historical Society resides in the county's historic courthouse, which is now a museum and research library.

Geography

Adjacent counties
Pawnee County, Nebraska (northeast)
Nemaha County (east)
Pottawatomie County (south)
Riley County (southwest)
Washington County (west)
Gage County, Nebraska (northwest)

Demographics

As of the census of 2000, there were 10,965 people, 4,458 households, and 3,026 families residing in the county.  The population density was 12 people per square mile (5/km2).  There were 4,999 housing units at an average density of 6 per square mile (2/km2).  The racial makeup of the county was 98.14% White, 0.23% Black or African American, 0.36% Native American, 0.19% Asian, 0.02% Pacific Islander, 0.26% from other races, and 0.80% from two or more races.  0.76% of the population were Hispanic or Latino of any race.

There were 4,458 households, out of which 30.20% had children under the age of 18 living with them, 59.70% were married couples living together, 5.40% had a female householder with no husband present, and 32.10% were non-families. 29.50% of all households were made up of individuals, and 17.00% had someone living alone who was 65 years of age or older.  The average household size was 2.40 and the average family size was 2.98.

In the county, the population was spread out, with 25.00% under the age of 18, 6.60% from 18 to 24, 23.60% from 25 to 44, 22.80% from 45 to 64, and 22.00% who were 65 years of age or older.  The median age was 42 years. For every 100 females there were 96.80 males.  For every 100 females age 18 and over, there were 94.00 males.

The median income for a household in the county was $32,089, and the median income for a family was $39,705. Males had a median income of $28,361 versus $19,006 for females. The per capita income for the county was $17,090.  About 6.40% of families and 9.20% of the population were below the poverty line, including 9.60% of those under age 18 and 9.10% of those age 65 or over.

Government

Presidential elections
Marshall County is a strongly Republican county. The county has not been carried by a Democratic candidate in a presidential election since 1932,  & has only failed to back the Republican candidate in two other elections from 1888 on. The closest Democrats have came to winning the county since 1932 was in 1964 when Barry Goldwater only won it by 98 votes in the midst of a national landslide by Lyndon B. Johnson & 1992 when George H. W. Bush only won it by eight votes in conjunction with independent candidate Ross Perot winning a significant share of the vote.

Laws
Marshall County was a prohibition, or "dry", county until the Kansas Constitution was amended in 1986 and voters approved the sale of alcoholic liquor by the individual drink with a 30 percent food sales requirement.

Education

Unified school districts
 Marysville USD 364
 Vermillion USD 380
 Valley Heights USD 498
Historical
 Axtell USD 488 (Marshall County) and Sabetha USD 441 (Nemaha County) consolidated to create Prairie Hills USD 113.

Communities

Cities

 Axtell
 Beattie
 Blue Rapids
 Frankfort
 Marysville
 Oketo
 Summerfield
 Vermillion
 Waterville

Census-designated place
 Home

Other unincorporated communities

 Bremen
 Cottage Hill
 Herkimer
 Lillis
 Marietta
 St. Bridget
 Vliets
 Winifred

Ghost towns

 Barrett
 Bigelow
 Irving
 Lone Elm
 Hull
 Mina
 Schroyer

Townships
Marshall County is divided into twenty-five townships.  The city of Marysville is considered governmentally independent and is excluded from the census figures for the townships.  In the following table, the population center is the largest city (or cities) included in that township's population total, if it is of a significant size.

Notable people
 Frank Wayenberg (1898-1975) - pitcher for the Cleveland Indians in 1924.
 Butch Nieman (1918-1993) - born in Herkimer, played outfield for the Boston Braves from 1943 to 1945.
 Don Songer (1899-1962) - pitcher for the Pittsburgh Pirates from 1924 to 1927 and the New York Giants in 1927.

See also
 National Register of Historic Places listings in Marshall County, Kansas

References

Further reading

 Atlas of Marshall County, Kansas; Anderson Publishing Co; 74 pages; 1922.
 Plat Book of Marshall County, Kansas; North West Publishing Co; 53 pages; 1904.
 Handbook of Marshall County, Kansas; Modern Argo; 12 pages; 1870s.

External links

County
 
 Marshall County - Directory of Public Officials
Historical
 Marysville Museum
Tornados
 Irving, KS Tornado
 Historical Tornado
Maps
 Marshall County maps: Current, Historic, KDOT
 Kansas Highway maps: Current, Historic, KDOT
 Kansas Railroad maps: Current, 1996, 1915, KDOT and Kansas Historical Society

 
Kansas counties
1855 establishments in Kansas Territory